Oskar Peterlini (born 19 September 1950), Lecturer at the Free University of Bozen Bolzano, is a Representative of the German-speaking South Tyrolean Minority in South Tyrol, Italy. He was a member of the Italian Senate in the Italian Parliament from 2001 to 2013, Member of the Regional Parliament of Trentino South Tyrol from 1978 to 1998 and its president from 1988–1998. He was also President of the district of the South Tyrolean Unterland of the South Tyrolean People's Party (SVP) from 2001 to 2010.

Life 

Peterlini was born on 19 September 1950 in Bolzano South Tyrol and lives today in the village of Bronzolo. He studied Economics at the Universities of Modena and Innsbruck, and graduated in Business Management at the University of Venice "Ca' Foscari", and specialized in Portfolio Management at the New York New York Institute of Finance. Recently he was awarded the Doctor in Social and economic science at the Faculty of Political science and Social sciences of the University of Innsbruck. He achieved his PhD with a Thesis about the Italian Constitutional reform and its impact on the special autonomies and with a research project about the electoral systems and their effect on linguistic minorities.
The brother of Oskar Peterlini is the journalist Hans Karl Peterlini. Oskar has four children.

Career 
Peterlini was from 1972 to 1979, first secretary then leader of the youth movement Junge Generation of the Südtiroler Volkspartei. He was elected 1978 as youngest member to the Regional Parliament of Trentino-Alto Adige/Südtirol and the Provincial Parliament Lantag of South Tyrol. Peterlini was a member of the regional Parliament from 1978 till 1998 and served as its president from 1988 to 1998. He was chairman of the Budget and Economic Legislative Committee from 1983 to 1993. Among his achievements were an innovative law for the youth (Jugendförderungsgesetz), one for family support and the first Italian law for animal protection. His most important work was the creation of a complementary pension system called Pens Plan for inhabitants of the Trentino South-Tyrol Region, whose activities he developed and coordinated starting from 1989.

In 2001 he was elected to the Italian Senate as representative of the Südtiroler Volkspartei in an electoral cooperation with the Ulivo party. He was re-elected in 2006 in cooperation with Romano Prodis coalition and 2008 in cooperation with the Partito Democratico, which itself is a successor party to the Ulivo and the Unione of Prodi parties: 2001 (SVP-Ulivo), 2006 (SVP-Unione) and 2008 (SVP-Autonomie).

He has been the President of the parliamentary group "Per le Autonomie" from 2006 to 2008. From 2001 to 2006 he has been member of the presidency of the legislative Committee for Welfare, from 2008 to 2013 also for School and Culture, and from 2006 to 2013 a member (at times Deputy Member) of the Committee for Constitutional Affairs of the Italian Senate. He is member of the parliamentary delegation of the Central European Initiative and President of its Cultural Commission.

Important Achievements 

Oskar Peterlini is the projector of the complementary pension system in the Trentino-Alto Adige/Südtirol region named Pensplan. In a collaboration between the region, unions and management he initiated the Pensplan system, which includes the service company of the Region called Centrum Pensplan, the pension founds Laborfonds and Plurifonds and the fund management company Pensplan Invest.

Publications 
Peterlini is the author of several books and publications relating to the Italian Constitution, the Special Statute of the Autonomous Region of Trentino South-Tyrol, about Federalism, Electoral Systems and about the New Complementary Pension System in Italy and in the Trentino South-Tyrol Region.

Links for reading and downloads 
 Publications by Oskar Peterlini, Academia.edu
 Publications by Oskar Peterlini, Issuu
 Books and publications by Oskar Peterlini in Bibliothekskatalog: Dr. Friedrich Teßmann Library in Bozen - South Tyrol

Federalism, autonomy 
 Italien und Österreich vor der UNO: Dokumente und Originalzitate zur friedlichen Beilegung eines langwierigen Streites, in Raffeiner, A. (ed): 25 Jahre Streitbeilegung 1992-2017 - Ist das "Südtirolproblem" gelöst?! Dr.-Kovač-Verlag, Hamburg 2018, .
 Italien – Aufbruch zur Mehrheitsdemokratie? Verfassungsreformen, Wahlgesetze und Verfassungsgerichtsurteile, Zeitschrift für Parlamentsfragen ZParl, 4/ 2017, Ed: Deutsche Vereinigung für Parlamentsfragen, Berlin. .
 Foundations and Institutions of South-Tyrol’s Autonomy in Italy, in Ghai, Y./ Woodman, S. (eds): Practising Self-Government: a comparative study of autonomous regions. Cambridge University Press, Cambridge 2013. . 
 Südtirols Autonomie und die Verfassungsreformen Italiens, Vom Zentralstaat zu föderalen Ansätzen: die Auswirkungen und ungeschriebenen Änderungen im Südtiroler Autonomiestatut (South Tyrol Autonomy and the Constitutional Reforms in Italy - The constitutional debate about new forms of democratic participation, the long road of Italy from the centralized state to timid federal principles, the direct interference with the autonomy statute, which formally has remained unchanged, New Academic Press (Braumüller) Wien 2012. .
 Come riformare la costituzione e i diritti. Considerazioni, disegni di legge e mozioni per una società più equa (How to reform the constitution and the rights - considerations, bills and motions for a more equitable society,) Prokopp & Hechensteiner, St. Pauls/Eppan (Bolzano) 2012. .
 Instruments for Direct Democracy in Italy/Strumenti di democrazia diretta in Italia, in Acts of Conference: Participatory Democracy and social Development, Free University of Bozen/Bolzano, Campus Brixen, Italy, 6.-8. September 2012, International Conference of ICSD (International Consortium for Social Development) European Branch and Free University of Bozen/Bolzano, Prokopp & Hechensteiner, St. Pauls Bozen 2012. .
 Steuerföderalismus in Italien, Spannungsfeld zwischen Verfassungszielen und Sparmaßnahmen, zwischen Nord und Süd (Fiscal federalism in Italy, tension between constitutional objectives and austerity measures, between North and South), Prokopp & Hechensteiner, St. Pauls Bozen 2012. .
 The Structure of the State – an Instrument of Peace? The South Tyrol Minority as an Example. L’assetto dello Stato – uno strumento di pace? L’esempio della minoranza sudtirolese, 26 – 28 April 2012 in Bolzano Bozen, Introductory speech by the President of the General Committee on Cultural Affairs of the CEI-Parliamentary Dimension, Sen. Oskar Peterlini, Chairperson of the Conference: Autonomy, Protection of National Minorities and Cultural Heritage as Tools for Peace, Conference proceedings, Bolzano-Bozen, Palace of the Autonomous Province, 26 – 28 April 2012. Prokopp & Hechensteiner, San Paolo 2012. .
 L’autonomia – strumento di pace (Autonomy - an instrument of peace), in Provenzano, F.M.: Federalismo, Devolution, Secessione – La storia continua. Ritorno al futuro, Editore Pellegrini Cosenza, 2011. . * Verfassung, Autonomie und Föderalismus
 Imparare dalla storia per costruire la pace (Learning from history for peace), Introduzione e cenni storici, in Scagnetti, G. (2011): Accadde al confine: storie di Giovanni Postal e Udo Grobar, La Feltrinelli Milano 2011. . * Accadde al confine: storie di Giovanni Postal e Udo Grobar
 L’autonomia che cambia, in Italian, The effects of the constitutional reform of 2001 on the Special Autonomy of South Tyrol an Trentino, Casa editrice Praxis 3 Bolzano 2010. . * Verfassung, Autonomie und Föderalismus
 Föderalismus und Autonomien in Italien,   Federalismo e Autonomie in Italia, in German and Italian with English summary, The effects of federal development in Italy on special autonomy, and especially on the Statute of the Trentino Alto Adige Südtirol,, PhD Thesis, Leopold Franzens University, Faculty of Political Science and Sociology, Innsbruck 2010. * Verfassung, Autonomie und Föderalismus
 Secessione, riforma costituzionale, Senato federale, devolution, federalismo fiscale e sicurezza (The projects of the Lega in the light of the autonomy), in Provenzano, F.M.: Dall’interno della Lega – Testi e documenti per conoscere tutto della Lega Nord, Presse libre Italia, stampa Lito Terrazzi Cascine del Riccio, Firenze 2010. . * Verfassung, Autonomie und Föderalismus
 Mit Herz und Seele für Österreich und Südtirol, Mit Klecatsky durch Erlebnisse und Geschichte, Recht und Politik,(Commemorative publication for the 90th Birthday), in: Raffeiner, A./ Matscher, F./ Pernthaler, P.: Ein Leben für Recht und Gerechtigkeit, FS für Hans Richard Klecatsky zum 90.Geburtstag, Neuer Wissenschaftlicher Verlag Wien 2010. . * Verfassung, Autonomie und Föderalismus
 The South-Tyrol Autonomy in Italy, Historical, Political and Legal Aspects. In: Oliveira J./Cardinal P. (edit.) (2009): One Country, Two Systems, Three Legal Orders – Perspectives of Evolution, Springer. , ISBN 978-3-540-68572- 2, DOI: 10.1007/978-3-540-68572-2, Libri 8094160:One Country, Two Systems, Three Legal Orders - Perspectives of Evolution (Buch) - portofrei bei Libri.de
 Südtirols Vertretung am Faden Roms, (The South Tyrolean Representation on the string of Rome – the effects of electoral systems on ethnic minorities) Die Auswirkungen von Wahlsystemen auf ethnische Minderheiten am Beispiel Südtirols in Rom von 1921–2013, in: Hilpold P. (ed) (2009): Minderheitenschutz in Italien, Reihe Ethnos 70, Braumüller Wien. . Braumüller Schulbuch & Wissenschaft - Wissen und Bildung seit 1783
 Südtirols Vertretung in Rom (The South Tyrolean Representation in Rome, short version about the effects of electoral systems) Die Auswirkungen von Wahlsystemen auf ethnische Minderheiten, Europa Ethnica 3/4, S. 97–106, Braumüller, Wien 2008, ISSN 0014-2492:;europa ethnica
 Die Föderalismusentwicklung in Italien und ihre Auswirkungen auf die Sonderautonomien (The development of federalism in Italy and the effects on the special autonomies), Zeitschrift für Öffentliches Recht (ZÖR 63), Springer Wien 2008. DOI 10.1007/S00708-008-0209-6, ISSN 0948-4396 (Print) 1613–7663 (Online):ingentaconnect Die Foderalismusentwicklung in Italien und ihre Auswirkungen auf .... * Verfassung, Autonomie und Föderalismus.
 Evoluzione in senso federale e riforma costituzionale in Italia (The development of federalism in Italy and the constitutional reform)it, FÖDOK 27, Institut für Föderalismus, Innsbruck 2008. :;. * Verfassung, Autonomie und Föderalismus
 Föderalistische Entwicklung und Verfassungsreform in Italien, (The development of federalism in Italy and the constitutional reform) de FÖDOK 25, Institut für Föderalismus, Innsbruck 2007. :;. * Verfassung, Autonomie und Föderalismus
 Autonomie und Minderheitenschutz in Südtirol und im Trentino (Autonomy and the Protection of Ethnic Minorities in Trentino-South Tyrol), Region Trentino-Südtirol, Bozen-Trient 1996, (2000 auch in ladinischer Sprache). Neuausgabe: Braumüller, Wien 1997, . Neuauflage: Region Trentino-Südtirol, Bozen-Trient 2000, :;Autonomie und Minderheitenschutz in Trentino-Südtirol: Überblick über Geschichte, Recht und Politik; BUCH ÜBER SÜDTIROL IM HOHEN HAUS PRÄSENTIERT (PK-Nr. 330/1997) | Parlament Österreich; 
 Autonomy and the Protection of Ethnic Minorities in Trentino-South Tyrol – An Overview of the History, Law and Politics, Braumüller, Wien 1997, :Braumüller Verlag -
 Autonomia e tutela delle minoranze nel Trentino-Alto Adige (Autonomy and the Protection of Ethnic Minorities in Trentino-South Tyrol), Consiglio della Regione Autonoma del Trentino Alto Adige, Bolzano Trento 1996, . Neuauflage 2000, :Item no longer available
 Aspetti e problemi dello Statuto di Autonomia, (Aspects and problems of the Autonomy Statute) in: "La storia dell‘Alto Adige", Istituto Magistrale Italiano, Bolzano 1980. New edition 1989.
 Il Sudtirolo, una prova d'esame per l'Europa / Südtirol – ein Prüfstein für Europa,(South Tyrol, a touchstone for Europe) (German, Italian), in Demarchi, F. (a cura di): Minoranze linguistiche fra storia e politica / Sprachliche Minderheiten zwischen Geschichte und Politik, Gruppo Culturale CIVIS, Biblioteca Cappuccini, CIVIS.Studi e Testi, Supplemento 4/1988, Trento, pp. 113–144.
 Der ethnische Proporz in Südtirol (The ethnic proportion in South Tyrol), Athesia, Bozen 1980. :http://www.buchfreund.de/productListing.php?used=1&productId=29724762

 Electoral systems 
 Minderheitenschutz und Wahlsysteme, Die Spielregeln von Wahlsystemen und ihre Auswirkungen auf Sprachminderheiten -  Südtirol und europäische Minderheiten im Blickfeld (Protection of minorities and electoral systems, the rules of electoral systems and their implications for linguistic minorities - An analysis based on empirical experiences of South Tyrolean and other ethnic minorities in Europe), New Academic Press (ex Braumüller) Wien 2012. .
 Mehrheitswahlrecht contra Proporz, Die Senatswahlkreise in Südtirol 1988 – 2012 (Majority voting system versus proportional representation, the Senate constituencies in South Tyrol 1988 – 2012), Prokopp & Hechensteiner, St. Pauls Bozen 2012. .
 Funzionamento dei sistemi elettorali e minoranze linguistiche (Electoral Systems and Linguistic Minorities), FrancoAngeli, Milano 2012. . * 
 Sistemi elettorali e minoranze linguistiche, Wahlsysteme und Sprachminderheiten, in German and Italian, The impact of electoral systems on minority representation in Parliament following the example of linguistic minorities in South Tyrol Südtirol, research projects at the Faculty of Political Science at the Leopold Franzens Universität Innsbruck 2010. * 
 Südtirols Vertretung am Faden Roms, (The South Tyrolean Representation on the string of Rome – the effects of electoral systems on an ethnic minorities) Die Auswirkungen von Wahlsystemen auf ethnische Minderheiten am Beispiel Südtirols in Rom von 1921–2013, in: Hilpold P. (ed) (2009): Minderheitenschutz in Italien, Reihe Ethnos 70, Braumüller Wien.  :
 Südtirols Vertretung in Rom (The South Tyrolean Representation in Rome, short version about the effects of electoral systems) Die Auswirkungen von Wahlsystemen auf ethnische Minderheiten, Europa Ethnica 3/4, S. 97–106, Braumüller, Wien 2008, ISSN 0014-2492:;

 Social security and pension funds 
 Le nuovi pensioni (The new pensions –experiences and strategies to avoid the pension crash). FrancoAngeli, Mailand 2003. :;
 Come cambia la tutela previdenziale: un’esperienza locale (How is changing the social security). In: I giovani e la previdenza complementare. Atti del convegno, 17 settembre 2003 a Bologna. Covip Bollettino Quaderno n. 4, Roma.
 Zukunft planen (Planning the future), Athesia, Bozen 2000. :
 Pianificare il futuro(Planning the future), Athesia, Bolzano 2000. .
 Assicurarsi il futuro, Zukunft sichern (Assuring the future) (German, Italian) Centrum PensPlan, Bolzano 1998.
 Das Familienpaket, Il pacchetto famiglia (The family package) (German, Italian) Casse Rurali dell'Alto Adige, Bolzano, 3 parts, 1992 and 1993.

Economy 
 Die totale Privatisierung . Ein gescheiterter Wahn/ La privatizzazione totale. Una pazzia fallita (The total privatization - A failed delusion), Vortrag/ relazione, Autonome Gewerkschaftsorganisation der Gebietskörperschaften/ Organizzazione Sindacale Autonoma degli enti locali AGO, 4. Landeskongress zum Thema: Öffentlicher Dienst im Würgegriff der Privatisierung/ 4. Congresso provinciale sul tema: Servizi pubblici nella morsa della privatizzazione 9.4. 2010, Bozen. Prokopp & Hechensteiner, St. Pauls Bozen 2012. . 
 Relazioni al bilancio provinciale (Record to the provincial budget) (German, Italian), annuali, come Presidente della Commissione Bilancio, Finanze ed Economia del Consiglio provinciale dell'Alto Adige, dal 1984 al 1994.
 Il bilancio della Provincia – uno strumento politico – economico (The provincial budget – a political economic instrument) (German, Italian), Consiglio della Provincia autonoma, Bolzano 1990.
 Wie geht’s uns in unserem Land (How do we live in our country?), supplement to OP-Information 63, OP-Werbung, Bolzano 1988.
 Quantitativer und qualitativer Bedarf an Arbeitskräften im öffentlichen Dienst in Südtirol (The quantitative and qualitative demand of employer in the public ministration), University of Innsbruck, Thesis, 1979.

Politics 
 Ein Visionär der alten Schule, in Benedikter, T.: Den Grundsätzen treu geblieben, Alfons Benedikters Wirken für Südtirol im Spiegel der Erinnerung, Prokopp & Hechensteiner KG St. Pauls Bolzano 2012. .

References 

1950 births
Living people
Members of the Senate of the Republic (Italy)
Members of the Regional Council of Trentino-Alto Adige
Politicians from Bolzano
Academic staff of the Free University of Bozen-Bolzano
South Tyrolean People's Party politicians
Ca' Foscari University of Venice alumni
University of Innsbruck alumni
Italian political writers